Falter is an Austrian weekly news magazine.

Falter may also refer to:

Falter (book), a non-fiction book by Bill McKibben

people with the surname:
Arthur R. Falter (1906–1979), American politician from Illinois
Bailey Falter (born 1997), American baseball player
John Falter (1910–1982), American artist
Jürgen W. Falter (born 1944), German political scientist
Martin Falter (born 1983), Czech ice hockey player
Vincent Falter (born 1932), retired U.S. Army major general